The Ridgefield Raptors are a collegiate summer baseball team. The Raptors are members of the West Coast League and play their home games at the Ridgefield Outdoor Recreation Complex.

History 
In 2018 it was announced that West Coast League had awarded an expansion franchise to be located in southwest Washington. Owner Tony Bonacci, who also headed the Cowliz Black Bears, sought to expand the league in the metro Portland region. Gus Farah was announced as the General Manager. The club held a name the team contest that drew five hundred entries. The name Raptors was selected following a number of entries related to the Ridgefield National Wildlife Refuge and various birds. The Raptors began play in 2019.

The Raptors made the 2021 playoffs but were beat by the Corvallis Knights 6 to 13 and 0 to 9 in a best of three series.

References

External links
 Official Website
 West Coast League website

2018 establishments in Washington (state)
Baseball teams established in 2018
Amateur baseball teams in Washington (state)